The Avoca River, an inland intermittent river of the northcentral catchment, part of the Murray-Darling basin, is located in the lower Riverina bioregion and Central Highlands and Wimmera regions of the Australian state of Victoria. The headwaters of the Avoca River rise on the northern slopes of the Pyrenees Range and descend to flow into the ephemeral Kerang Lakes.

Features and location
The Avoca River drains a substantial part of central Victoria. Two major distributaries leave the Avoca River between Charlton and Quambatook: Tyrrell Creek, flowing to Lake Tyrrell, and Lalbert Creek flowing to Lake Lalbert.

Although the Avoca River basin is part of the Murray-Darling basin, the Avoca River does not empty into the Murray.

Of all the Victorian rivers in the Murray-Darling basin, the Avoca River is the most variable. In dry years, the flow can stop for many months.

Although it is the only river of significance in the area, no major water storages have been constructed on it, but there are six weirs of only local significance. Little use of the river is made for irrigation because, during the peak demand periods of summer and autumn, it is often not flowing. During low-flow periods, the water is usually too saline to use on crops, but can still provide drinking water for sheep and cattle.

The river is crossed by the Pyrenees Highway at Avoca, and the Borung Highway and the Calder Highway at Charlton.

Etymology
As the river is relatively long, Aboriginal peoples from various cultural groups lived near the river course. In the Djadjawurrung, Wathawurrung, Wergaia, and Wembawemba languages, the river has several names, including Natte yaluk and Boca, both with no clearly defined meaning; Bangyeno Banip, meaning bunyip waterholes; Djub-djub-galg, meaning a place where melaleuca was abundant; Witchelliba, with witji meaning basket grass and bar meaning river; and Yangeba, with no clearly defined meaning.

See also

References

External links

North-Central catchment
Rivers of Grampians (region)
Rivers of Loddon Mallee (region)
Tributaries of the Murray River
Wimmera
Central Highlands (Victoria)